The Miss Universe Iceland 2016 pageant was held on September 12, 2016. This year only 30 candidates were competing for the national crown. Each delegate represents a region or a city of the country. The chosen winner was Hildur Maria Leifsdóttir, she represented Iceland at the Miss Universe 2016 but did not place. The winner of best national costume, the costume will be used in Miss Universe 2016.

Final Results

Official Scores 

     Winner
     1st Runner-up
     2nd Runner-up
     3rd Runner-up
     4th Runner-up
     Top 10
     Top 15

Official Delegates

External links
Official Website

2016
2016 beauty pageants